Miloslav Čermák (born 15 November 1986) is a Czech professional ice hockey forward who currently plays for HC Slavia Praha of the Czech Extraliga.

Čermák played previously for HC Rebel Havlíčkův Brod.

References

External links

1986 births
Living people
HC Slavia Praha players
Czech ice hockey forwards
BK Havlíčkův Brod players
Sportspeople from Havlíčkův Brod
Stadion Hradec Králové players
HC Slovan Ústečtí Lvi players
HC Stadion Litoměřice players
Motor České Budějovice players